Jeffrey Simon Golden (born April 24, 1950) is a political activist, radio personality, politician and author from Southern Oregon. His commentary and political leaning are progressive. He is the producer and host of the regional PBS series Immense Possibilities. In 2018, he was elected to the Oregon State Senate, representing District 3.

Personal background
Golden was born in Los Angeles, California, the second of four children born to Lane and Jack Golden. His siblings include KC Golden, Policy Director for the Seattle based Climate Change Advocacy group Climate Solutions; Michael Golden, a tribal judge in Humboldt County, California; and Jesse Golden. Jeff grew up in Beverly Hills, California, and graduated from Beverly Hills High School in 1968 as the Student Body President and at the top of his class.

Golden attended Harvard as a Harvard National Scholar, a scholarship program established in honor of Harvard’s 300th anniversary with the goal of encouraging and enabling a small number of the best students from across the nation to attend the university. At college, Golden was active in efforts in opposition to the Vietnam War. In May 1970, he tried to join the Venceremos Brigade, but was turned down. Instead, Golden volunteered with northern students to support the work of Featherfield Farm, the first ever sharecroppers' cooperative, created under the Georgia Council on Human Relations in Southwest Georgia. The experience inspired Golden to leave Harvard and try to build a sustainable life on a plot of land in rural Southern Oregon, an experience chronicled in Golden's first published book, Watermelon Summer: A Journal.

In the early 1970s, Golden worked as a river guide for American River Touring Association. Golden and his then girlfriend Catherine Shaw were featured in the 1978 documentary film Riverdogs by fellow Harvard alumnus Robb Moss. The film followed 17 people on a month-long rafting trip down the Colorado River. The couple were married the next year.

In 1980, Golden was accepted into the Stanford University’s Broadcast Communications master's program after publishing Watermelon Summer, an essay about his life in the 1970s. The couple had two children before divorcing in 1994, and Shaw went on to have a career as a politician and political consultant. Both appeared in the 2003 documentary film The Same River Twice, a follow-up to Riverdogs.

Radio career
Jeff Golden has spent 25 years in public broadcasting, print journalism, politics, and mediation. For 10 years, he was the host for Jefferson Public Radio’s show Jefferson Exchange, from 1997-2007. This award-winning daily talk and interview program aired on NPR’s largest regional network in Southern Oregon and Northern California.

The show was described by the website as a "lively two-hour interactive program devoted to issues facing the State of Jefferson, the Northwest, the nation and the world. In the first hour, Jeff trades views with callers on a wide range of topics. In hour two, fascinating guests join in the discussion."

Golden left the radio show in June 2007 to explore a candidacy for the United States Senate in the 2008 election. After opting to not run in August 2007, he started a new independent radio program called Immense Possibilities Radio (IPR). The purpose behind IPR, as describe by PERC.org, is to "strengthen civic involvement and harness the power of talk radio for quality, open-minded dialogue. By bringing individuals together on the air, Golden wants to minimize conflicts over ideology and focus on ‘what works.’"

Political career
Golden served as County Commissioner for Jackson County, Oregon from 1987-1991. During this time, he became involved in the spotted owl controversy and petitions for his recall circulated among logging advocacy groups. One result in the wake of the controversy was his nomination for the John F. Kennedy Library Foundation Profile and Courage award, the nation's most prestigious honor for elected public servants Golden was the first nominee from Oregon.

In 1990, after narrowly losing to fourth-term Republican incumbent Lenn Hannon for a seat in the State Senate, Golden took the position of Bill Bradbury’s Chief of Staff in 1993. Bradbury was President of the Oregon Senate at the time.

In July 2007, Golden announced his intention to run against Gordon Smith for the US Senate seat for Oregon. Golden stepped out of the election in August 2007.

Works

Books
Watermelon Summer: A Journal Published (1971) - an account of Golden’s decision to drop out of Harvard and live off-the-grid in rural Southern Oregon.
Forest Blood (1999) -  a novel about the Northwest timber wars challenging the dichotomy of "us versus them" between the environmentalists and loggers in Southern Oregon.
As If We Were Grownups: A Collection of "Suicidal" Political Speeches That Aren’t (2004) - is based on the premise that politicians address the American public as though they were children and is a collection of speeches that are addressed to an audience that would be the least likely to want to hear them.
Unafraid: A Novel of the Possible - an alternate history premised on John F. Kennedy surviving the assassination attempt in Dallas and serving two full terms.

Filmography
Riverdogs (1978) -  documentary following 16 hippies for a month-long rafting trip down the Colorado River.
The Same River Twice (2003) - a follow-up documentary on the lives of the cast in Riverdogs

External links 
 Campaign website
 Legislative website

References

County commissioners in Oregon
Radio personalities from Oregon
Politicians from Los Angeles
Democratic Party Oregon state senators
1950 births
Harvard University alumni
Living people
People from Jackson County, Oregon